Arif Aziz (or: Ариф Азиз; * 1943 in Baku; with full name: Aziz Arif Mokhubali / Азиз Ариф Мохубали) is an artist from Azerbaijan, living and teaching in its capital, Baku. He is one of Azerbaijan's internationally known contemporary artists and serves as his country's Ambassador for Peace, People’s Artist of Azerbaijan Republic and Professor at Azerbaijani State University of Art and Culture.

Life 
Arif Aziz was born in Baku in 1943, where he lives and works. He studied at first, between 1957 and 1962, at the Azerbaijan State University of Culture and Art. He then studied graphic design in Moscow for five years. Since the early 1970s he teaches fine arts at the country's art schools. In 2005 he took the chair of painting at Beykent University in Istanbul, Turkey, which he held until 2007. After that he became Dean of the Azerbaijan State University of Culture and Art.

Arif Aziz is married to Farida Azizova. They have three daughters. Aysel Aziz, Ayan Aziz Mammadova and Aylal Heydarova.

Works 
When Aziz initially began painting he had to follow the teachings of socialist realism, which required that he paint glorified depictions of communist values. Despite this restriction he found a way to go around the restrictions of Soviet times and painted attractions, cities, and landscapes of his homeland in a figurative art style. In his art Aziz also combines the human face with traditional ornaments from his homeland, as well as influences gathered during travels to Africa, Moscow, Paris, Turkey and India.

Aziz is credited as helping to shape a school of abstractionism that has impacted many young Azerbaijanian artists.

Collections and public exhibitions

Public collections 
Works by Arif Aziz can be found in the following collections:
 Azerbaijan Carpet Museum in Baku
 Baku Museum of Modern Art 
 Moscow Museum of Modern Art
 Senegal State Art Museum in Dakar

Exhibitions (selected)
The following are selected exhibits where Aziz' work has been displayed as either a solo work or as part of a main group exhibition.

 solo show: Spirituelle Komposition, Kunsthalle Dresden 2015
 solo show: Dance of Spirit, Galerie Michael Schultz, Berlin 2015
 solo show: Danamik und Symbolik, Kunsthalle Messmer, Riegel (Germany) 2015
 group show: Yeni Era, 11, World Art Academy Exhibition, Baku Museum of Modern Art 2014
 solo show: RTR Gallery, Paris 2013
 group show: Central House of Artists, Moscow 2011
 group show: Turkish Days in Azerbaijan, Baku 2008

Bibliography 
 Arif Aziz: Dance of Spirit, (exhibition catalogue, edd. by Kunsthalle Messmer, Galerie Michael Schultz, Kunsthalle Dresden), Berlin 2015
 Arsalan Mohammed und Hans Bussert, From Baku to Berlin, in: SLEEK – THE VISUAL CONTEMPORARY, Spring 2015, Berlin 2015, pp. 84–91

References

External links 
 
 Arif Aziz  at the World Academy of the Arts, Baku
 Gallery representation at Michael Schultz Gallery, Berlin, Seoul, Beijing

Azerbaijan State University of Culture and Arts alumni
1943 births
Contemporary painters
Living people
Artists from Baku
Azerbaijani expatriates in Turkey
Academic staff of Beykent University